Molly Veronica Byrne  (born 30 November 1928) is a former Australian politician who represented the South Australian House of Assembly seats of Barossa from 1965 to 1970, Tea Tree Gully from 1970 to 1977, and Todd from 1977 to 1979 for the Labor Party.

At the 1965 election Byrne was Labor's first woman elected to the Parliament of South Australia, the second woman elected to the House of Assembly, and the third woman elected to the Parliament of South Australia after the Liberal and Country League's Jessie Cooper and Joyce Steele both elected at the 1959 election.

In 1985 Byrne was awarded the Medal of the Order of Australia for "service to the community and parliamentary service".

See also
Women and government in Australia
Women in the South Australian House of Assembly

References

External links
Interview with Molly Byrne: Flinders Uni 12 July 2011
 

1928 births
Living people
Members of the South Australian House of Assembly
Australian Labor Party members of the Parliament of South Australia
Women members of the South Australian House of Assembly
Recipients of the Medal of the Order of Australia